Halysidota steinbachi is a moth of the family Erebidae. It was described by Walter Rothschild in 1909. It is found in Argentina, Bolivia and Brazil.

The larvae feed on Celtis species (including C. spinosa) and Ruellia longifolia.

References

Halysidota
Moths described in 1909